St. Leonard's Priory may refer to:
 St Leonard's Priory, Grimsby
 St Leonard's Priory, London
 St. Leonard's Priory, Norwich
 St Leonard's Priory, Stamford
 St. Leonard's Hospital chapel, in the grounds of York Museum Gardens